Chandepally is a village in Yadadri Bhuvanagiri district in Telangana state, India. It falls under Mootakondur mandal.

References

Villages in Yadadri Bhuvanagiri district